Woman's Intuition or Women's Intuition may refer to:

Books and comics
 Women's Intuition, book by Lisa Samson that was a finalist for the Christy Award
 "A Woman's Intuition", chapter of the manga Tuxedo Gin
 "Women's Intuition", a chapter of the manga series Kobato
 "A Woman's Intuition", a chapter of the manga series Freezing
 "Feminine Intuition", a short story by Isaac Asimov featuring Susan Calvin.

Film and television
 "A Woman's Intuition", an episode of The Doris Day Show
 Woman's Intuition, short film by Patrick Rea
 "Women's Intuition", an episode of the American television series 90210
 Women's Intuition, 2004 film with Alexander Dyachenko

Music

Albums
 A Woman's Intuition, album by Laila Dalseth

Songs
 "A Woman's Intuition", song by The Wilburn Brothers
 "A Woman's Intuition", song on The Grumbleweeds Radio Show 
 "A Woman's Intuition", song by LaWanda Lindsey from the album Swingin' & Singin' My Song
 "A Woman's Intuition", song by Tiny Topsy
 "Woman's Intuition", song by Michelle Wright from the album Michelle Wright
 "Woman's Intuition", song by Angela Bofill from the album Tell Me Tomorrow
 "Woman's Intuition", song by Maria Lawson from the album Maria Lawson
 "Woman's Intuition", song by Priscilla Wright from the album When You Love Somebody
 "Women's Intuition", song by Ian Hunter from the album YUI Orta

Other uses
 Women's Intuition (hats), an art piece by Lenka Clayton

See also
 Energetic Pregnancy, Women's Intuition, Women, Sex, & Desire: Exploring Your Sexuality at Every Stage of Life, book by Elizabeth Davis
 Intuition (disambiguation)